The 2015 World Shotgun Championships were held from 9 to 18 September 2015 in Lonato, Italy. As in all odd-numbered years, separate ISSF World Shooting Championships were carried out in the trap, Double Trap and skeet events.

Competition schedule

Men

Women

Medal summary

References
Official schedule

ISSF World Shooting Championships
World Shotgun Championships
Shooting
2015 in Italian sport
Shooting competitions in Italy